Royal Brunei Airlines is the flag carrier of Brunei. It was established as the state-owned national airline of the country on 18 November 1974, with the aid of British Airways and its subsidiary companies. Scheduled services began on 14 May 1975, linking Bandar Seri Begawan with Singapore using Boeing 737-200 equipment. After a year of operations, the route network consisted of Bandar Seri Begawan, Hong Kong, Kota Kinabalu, Kuching and Singapore.

, Royal Brunei Airlines served 18 destinations, ten of them in Southeast Asia (three in Indonesia, two in Malaysia, and a single destination in Brunei, the Philippines, Singapore, Thailand and Vietnam), three in China, one in South Korea and four more beyond Asia (Dubai, Jeddah, London and Melbourne). Following is a list of current and terminated destinations the airline serves according to its scheduled services, .

List

Notes

References

External links

Lists of airline destinations